Zhangcha duck, tea-smoked duck, or simply smoked duck is a quintessential dish of Sichuan cuisine. It is prepared by hot smoking a marinated duck over tea leaves and camphor leaves. Some cookbooks and authors have used leaves and twigs of the camphor plant in smoking due to the dish's name, but this is a misunderstanding. Due to its complicated preparation, Zhangcha duck was eaten more often at banquets or festive events than as a daily household dish.

Preparation
The duck is first marinated for several hours with a rub containing a typical combination of whole or crushed Sichuan pepper, huangjiu or baijiu (fermented or distilled Chinese wine), ginger, garlic, and salt, with much of it rubbed inside the cavity of the duck. For intensity of taste, sometimes the marinade rub is augmented with choujiu, black pepper, tea leaves, and camphor leaves. Following the marination, the duck is quickly blanched in hot water to tighten the skin, and then towel and air dried. This step ensures that the skin of the duck will not turn bitter during smoking. A wok is then prepared for smoking the duck with black tea leaves. Following a smoke treatment of approximately 10–15 minutes, the duck is then steamed for another 10 minutes before being deep fried in vegetable oil until its skin is crisp.

The duck is consumed wrapped in clam-shaped buns called gua bao.

See also

 List of duck dishes
 List of smoked foods

References

Sichuan cuisine
Duck dishes
Smoked meat
Tea dishes